According to the Buddhavaṃsa of the Pali Canon, Padumuttara or Padumuttara Buddha is the thirteenth of the twenty-nine buddhas who preceded the historical Gautama Buddha.

In the Buddhavamsa, he is described as:
One hundred thousand aeons ago, Padumuttara Buddha, who knows everything and deserves every donations, was born alone in that aeon.

Biography 
He was born in Hamsavatī. He lived for ten thousand years in three palaces: Naravāhana, Yassa (or Yasavatī) and Vasavatti. His wife was Vasudattā, by whom he had a son, Uttara. His body was fifty-eight cubits (between 26.51 meters, or 87 feet) high.

He practiced asceticism for seven days. He died in Nandārāma at the age of one hundred thousand, and a stūpa twelve leagues in height was erected over his relics.

His life parallels that of Gautama Buddha except that he was assisted by different people and his bodhi tree was a sarala (Dipterocarpus zeylanicus) in Theravada buddhism. Many of Gautama Buddha's disciples were said to have made their aspiration for eminent positions in the time of Padumuttara.

In the Apadāna some gods wish to build a stūpa of their own over the relics of Padumuttara. As a Tathāgata his relics were not separated. Dīpankara attained Nirvāṇa in Nandārāma, where  a stūpa was built which was thirty-six yojanas high.

The Buddha and the Lotus
According to the Buddhavamsa, a sacred lotus appears wherever the foot of Padumuttara lands. The lotuses had a length of 90 cubits or 135 feet and a breadth of 60 cubits or 90 feet. The stamens were 30 cubits or 45 feet and the petals were 12 cubits or 18 feet. When his right foot lands, 2.25 quarts of pollen were produced. When he took another step, the previous lotus disappeared and a new one appeared.

See also
List of the twenty-eight Buddhas

References

External links
 Vipassana.info: Pali Proper Names Dictionary

Buddhas